Patratu railway station is a small railway station in Ramgarh district, Jharkhand. Its code is PTRU. It serves Patratu town. The station consists of a two-platform. The platform is sheltered. It has facilities including water and sanitation but are not well maintained.

References 

Dhanbad railway division
Railway stations in Ramgarh district